Yosemite National Park is an American national park in California, surrounded on the southeast by Sierra National Forest and on the northwest by Stanislaus National Forest. Designated a World Heritage Site in 1984, Yosemite is internationally recognized for its cliffs, waterfalls, clear streams, giant sequoia groves, lakes, mountains, meadows, glaciers, and biological diversity. Almost 95 percent of the park is designated wilderness. Yosemite is one of the largest and least fragmented habitat blocks in the Sierra Nevada, and the park supports a diversity of plants and animals.

The geology of the Yosemite area is characterized by granite rocks and remnants of older rock. About 10 million years ago, the Sierra Nevada was uplifted and tilted to form its unique slopes, which increased the steepness of stream and river beds, resulting in the formation of deep, narrow canyons. About one million years ago glaciers formed at higher elevations which eventually melted and moved downslope, cutting and sculpting the U-shaped valley that attracts so many visitors to its scenic vistas.

European American settlers first entered Yosemite Valley itself in 1851. There are earlier instances of other travelers entering the Valley but James D. Savage is credited with discovering the area that became Yosemite National Park. Despite Savage and others claiming their discovery of Yosemite, the region and Valley itself have been inhabited for nearly 4,000 years, although humans may have visited the area as long as 8,000 to 10,000 years ago.

Yosemite was critical to the development of the national park idea. Galen Clark and others lobbied to protect Yosemite Valley from development, ultimately leading to President Abraham Lincoln's signing of the Yosemite Grant of 1864 which declared Yosemite as federally preserved land. It was not until 1890 that John Muir led a successful movement which had Congress establish Yosemite Valley and its surrounding areas as a National Park. This helped pave the way for the National Park System. The park set a visitation record in 2016, surpassing five million visitors for the first time in its history. The park began requiring reservations to access the park during peak periods starting in 2020 as a response to the rise in visitors.

Toponym
The word Yosemite (meaning "killer" in Miwok) historically referred to the name that the Miwok gave to the Ahwahneechee People, an Indigenous tribe driven out of Yosemite Valley by the Mariposa Battalion. Previously, the region had been called "Ahwahnee" ("big mouth") by its only Indigenous inhabitants, the Ahwahneechee. The term Yosemite in Miwok is easily confused with a similar term for "grizzly bear", and is still a common misconception.

History

Ahwahneechee and the Mariposa Wars

The indigenous natives of Yosemite called themselves the Ahwahneechee, meaning "dwellers" in Ahwahnee. The Ahwahneechee People was the only tribe that lived in the boundaries of Yosemite National Park but other tribes lived in its surrounding areas, together they formed a larger Indigenous population in California, called the Southern Sierra Miwok. They are related to the Northern Paiute and Mono tribes. Other tribes like the Central Sierra Miwoks and the Yokuts, who both lived in the San Joaquin Valley and central California, visited Yosemite to trade and intermarry with the Ahwahneechee. This resulted in a blending of culture which helped preserve Indigenous people's presence in Yosemite after early American settlements and urban development threatened their survival. Vegetation and game in the region were similar to modern times; acorns were a staple to their diet, as well as other seeds and plants, salmon and deer.

A major event impacting the native population of Yosemite and all of California in the mid-19th century was the California Gold Rush, which drew more than 90,000 European Americans to the area in less than two years, causing competition for resources between gold miners and the local Natives. Before large amounts of European settlers arrived in California, about 70 years before the Gold Rush, the Indigenous population was estimated to be 300,000, once the Gold Rush started it dropped down to 150,000, and just ten years later, only about 50,000 remained. The reason for such a decline in the Native American population results from numerous reasons including disease, birth rate decreases, starvation, and the conflicts from the American Indian Wars. The conflict in Yosemite is known as the Mariposa War, it started in December 1850 when California funded a state militia to drive Native people from contested territory, also known as Indigenous traditional and sacred homelands; the goal was to suppress Native American resistance to American expansion.

In retaliation to the extermination and domestication of their people, and loss of their lands and resources, Yosemite Indian tribes often stole from settlers and miners, sometimes killing them, both actions seen as tribute for the great losses they experienced. The War and formation of the Mariposa Battalion was partially the result of a single incident involving James Savage, a trader in Fresno, California whose trading post was attacked in December, 1850. After the incident, Savage rallied other miners and gained the support of local officials to pursue revenge and a full out war against the Natives, that is how he was appointed United States Army Major and leader the Mariposa Battalion in the beginning of 1851. He and Captain John Boling were responsible for pursuing the Ahwahneechee people that were being led by Chief Tenaya and driving them as far west as possible, out of Yosemite. In March 1851 under the command of Savage, the Mariposa Battalion captured about 70 Ahwahneechee and planned to take them to a reservation in Fresno, but they all managed to escape. Later in May, under the command of Boling, the battalion captured 35 Ahwahneechee including Chief Tenaya and marched them to the reservation but most were allowed to eventually leave and the rest escaped. Tenaya and others fled across the Sierra Nevada and settled with the Mono Lake Paiutes. Tenaya and some of his companions were ultimately killed in 1853 either over stealing horses or a gambling conflict and the survivors of Tenaya's group and other Ahwahneechee were absorbed into the Mono Lake Paiute tribe.

Accounts from this battalion were the first well-documented reports of ethnic Europeans entering Yosemite Valley. Attached to Savage's unit was Doctor Lafayette Bunnell, who later wrote about his awestruck impressions of the valley in The Discovery of the Yosemite. Bunnell is credited with naming Yosemite Valley, based on his interviews with Chief Tenaya. Bunnell wrote that Chief Tenaya was the founder of the Ahwahnee colony. Bunnell falsely believed that the word "Yosemite" meant "full-grown grizzly bear." In fact, "Yosemite" was derived from the Miwok term for the Ahwaneechee people: yohhe'meti, meaning "they are killers".

Indigenous peoples' presence post war and since

After the Mariposa War, a number of Native Americans continued to live in the Yosemite area, despite their overall population being severely decreased in the present-day park's boundary. The remaining Yosemite Ahwahneechee tribe members there were forced to relocate to an Indian village constructed in 1851 by the state government . They learned to live within this camp and their limited rights, adapting to the changing environment by taking advantage of the growing tourism industry through employment opportunities and creating small businesses from selling goods and providing services. Despite the integration of Indigenous people into the growing American settlement and tourism industry, their villages were destroyed and their people were forced to relocate four different times throughout the park's history. The U.S. Army was responsible for the village's destruction in 1851 and 1906, and the National Park Service was responsible for it in 1929 and 1969. In 1969, the National Park Service evicted the remaining Native people from their residences and destroyed their village as part of a fire-fighting exercise. A reconstructed "Indian Village of Ahwahnee" has been erected behind the Yosemite Museum, located next to the Yosemite Valley Visitor Center.

By the late 19th century, the population of all native inhabitants in Yosemite was difficult to determine, estimates ranged from smaller numbers, such as thirty individuals, to several hundred. The Ahwahneechee people and their descendants were even harder to identify. The last full-blooded Ahwahneechee died in 1931, her name was Totuya, or Maria Lebrado, she was the granddaughter of Chief Tenaya and one of many forced out of her ancestral homelands in Yosemite National Park. Now the Ahwahneechee live through the memory of their descendants, their fellow Yosemite Natives, and through museums like the Yosemite, California museum exhibit in the Smithsonian and the Yosemite Museum. As a method of self preservation and resilience, the Indigenous people of California proposed treaties in 1851 and 1852 which would have established land reservations for them but Congress refused to sign them. The quest for justice and sovereignty by Yosemite Natives has been ongoing for well over a hundred years. The Southern Sierra Miwuk Nation is still seeking tribal sovereignty and federal recognition, which is critical for their wellbeing and cultural preservation. Progress has been made in terms of the relationship between the U.S. government and tribal governments with the National Park Service creating policies to protect Indigenous sacred sites and allow Natives to return to their homelands and use National Park resources.

Early tourists

 
 
In 1855, entrepreneur James Mason Hutchings, artist Thomas Ayres and two others were the first to tour the area. Hutchings and Ayres were responsible for much of the earliest publicity about Yosemite, writing articles and special magazine issues about the Valley. Ayres' style in art was highly detailed with exaggerated angularity. His works and written accounts were distributed nationally, and an art exhibition of his drawings was held in New York City. Hutchings' publicity efforts between 1855 and 1860 led to an increase in tourism to Yosemite. A number of Natives in Yosemite supported the growing tourism industry by working as laborers or maids. Later, they became part of the tourism industry itself by performing dances for tourists, being guides, and selling handcrafted goods, most notably woven baskets. The Indian village and its peoples were of immense interest to visitors, especially James Hutchings who was a large advocate for Yosemite tourism, he and many others considered the Indigenous presence as one of Yosemite's greatest attractions.

Wawona was an early Indian encampment for Nuchu and Ahwahneechee Natives that were captured and relocated to a reservation on the Fresno River by the Mariposa Battalion and James Savage in March 1851. Settler Galen Clark discovered the Mariposa Grove of giant sequoia in Wawona in 1857. He had simple lodgings built, and roads to the area. In 1879, the Wawona Hotel was built to serve tourists visiting Mariposa Grove. As tourism increased, so did the number of trails and hotels developed by people intending to build on the trade.

The Wawona Tree, also known as the Tunnel Tree, was a famous giant sequoia that stood in the Mariposa Grove. When a carriage-wide tunnel was cut through the tree in 1881, it became even more popular as a tourist photo attraction. Everything from horse-drawn carriages in the late 19th century, to automobiles in the first part of the 20th century, traveled the road which passed through that tree. The tree was permanently weakened by the tunnel, and the Wawona Tree fell in 1969 under a heavy load of snow. It was estimated to have been 2,100 years old.

Yosemite's first concession was established in 1884 when John Degnan and his wife established a bakery and store. In 1916, the National Park Service granted a 20-year concession to the Desmond Park Service Company. It bought out or built hotels, stores, camps, a dairy, a garage, and other park services. The Hotel Del Portal was completed in 1908 by a subsidiary corporation of the Yosemite Valley Railroad. It was located at El Portal, California just outside of Yosemite. Desmond changed its name to the Yosemite National Park Company in December 1917 and was reorganized in 1920.

The Curry Company had been started in 1899 by David and Jennie Curry to provide concessions in the park. They also founded Camp Curry, formerly known as Half Dome Village, now restored back to Curry Village.

Administrators in the National Park Service felt that limiting the number of concessionaires in each national park would be more financially sound. The Curry Company and its rival, the Yosemite National Park Company, were forced to merge in 1925 to form the Yosemite Park & Curry Company (YP&CC). The company built the Ahwahnee Hotel in 1926–27.

Yosemite Grant

Concerned by the effects of commercial interests, prominent citizens including Galen Clark and Senator John Conness advocated for protection of the area. A park bill was prepared with the assistance of the General Land Office in the Interior Department. The bill passed both houses of the 38th United States Congress, and was signed by President Abraham Lincoln on June 30, 1864, creating the Yosemite Grant. This is the first instance of park land being set aside specifically for preservation and public use by action of the U.S. federal government, and set a precedent for the 1872 creation of Yellowstone as the first national park. Yosemite Valley and the Mariposa Grove were ceded to California as a state park, and a board of commissioners was proclaimed two years later.

Galen Clark was appointed by the commission as the Grant's first guardian, but neither Clark nor the commissioners had the authority to evict homesteaders (which included Hutchings). The issue was not settled until 1872 when the homesteader land holdings were invalidated by the U.S. Supreme Court. Clark and the reigning commissioners were ousted in 1880, this dispute also reaching the Supreme Court in 1880. The two Supreme Court decisions affecting management of the Yosemite Grant are considered important precedents in land management law. Hutchings became the new park guardian.

Access to the park by tourists improved in the early years of the park, and conditions in the Valley were made more hospitable. Tourism significantly increased after the First transcontinental railroad was completed in 1869, but the long horseback ride to reach the area was a deterrent. Three stagecoach roads were built in the mid-1870s to provide better access for the growing number of visitors to Yosemite Valley.

John Muir was a Scottish-born American naturalist and explorer. It was because of Muir that many National Parks were left untouched, such as Yosemite Valley National Park. One of the most significant camping trips Muir took was in 1903 with then-president Theodore Roosevelt. This trip persuaded Roosevelt to return "Yosemite Valley and Mariposa Grove to federal protection as part of Yosemite National Park".

Muir wrote articles popularizing the area and increasing scientific interest in it. Muir was one of the first to theorize that the major landforms in Yosemite Valley were created by large alpine glaciers, bucking established scientists such as Josiah Whitney, who regarded Muir as an amateur. Muir wrote scientific papers on the area's biology. Landscape architect Frederick Law Olmsted emphasized the importance of conservation of Yosemite Valley.

Increased protection efforts

Overgrazing of meadows (especially by sheep), logging of giant sequoia, and other damage caused Muir to become an advocate for further protection. Muir convinced prominent guests of the importance of putting the area under federal protection; one such guest was Robert Underwood Johnson, editor of Century Magazine. Muir and Johnson lobbied Congress for the Act that created Yosemite National Park on October 1, 1890. The State of California, however, retained control of Yosemite Valley and Mariposa Grove. Muir's writings raised awareness about the damage caused by sheep grazing, and he actively campaigned to virtually eliminate grazing from the Yosemite's high-country ecosystem.

The newly created national park came under the jurisdiction of the United States Army's Troop I of the 4th Cavalry on May 19, 1891, which set up camp in Wawona with Captain Abram Epperson Wood as acting superintendent. By the late 1890s, sheep grazing was no longer a problem, and the Army made other improvements. The cavalry could not intervene to ease the worsening condition of Yosemite Valley and Mariposa Grove. From 1899 to 1913, cavalry regiments of the Western Department, including the all Black 9th Cavalry (known as the "Buffalo Soldiers") and the 1st Cavalry, stationed two troops at Yosemite.

Muir and his Sierra Club continued to lobby the government and influential people for the creation of a unified Yosemite National Park. In May 1903, President Theodore Roosevelt camped with Muir near Glacier Point for three days. On that trip, Muir convinced Roosevelt to take control of Yosemite Valley and Mariposa Grove away from California and return it to the federal government. In 1906, Roosevelt signed a bill that did precisely that.

National Park Service
The National Park Service was formed in 1916, and Yosemite was transferred to that agency's jurisdiction. Tuolumne Meadows Lodge, Tioga Pass Road, and campgrounds at Tenaya and Merced lakes were also completed in 1916. Automobiles started to enter the park in ever-increasing numbers following the construction of all-weather highways to the park. The Yosemite Museum was founded in 1926 through the efforts of Ansel Franklin Hall. In the 1920s, the museum featured Native Americans practicing traditional crafts, and many of the Southern Sierra Miwok continued to live in Yosemite Valley until they were completely evicted from Yosemite National Park in the 1960s. Although the National Park Service helped create the Yosemite Museum which showcased some Indigenous presence at the time, its early actions and organizational values were detrimental to the Yosemite Natives and the Ahwahneechee. The National Park Service in the early 20th century criticized and even restricted the expression of Indigenous culture and behavior in Yosemite, for instance Park officials penalized Natives for playing games and drinking during the Indian Field Days of 1924.  The NPS had more direct and devastating impacts on the Yosemite Natives though. In 1929, Park Superintendent Charles G. Thomson concluded that the Indian village was aesthetically unpleasant and was limiting white settler development. Thomson eventually ordered the camp be burned down. In 1969, many Natives in the Indian village were forced to leave in search of work as a result of the decline in tourism. The NPS demolished those empty houses, evicted the remaining people from their homes, and destroyed the entire village. This was the last Indigenous settlement to exist within Yosemite's Valley and the National Park, effectively removing all the Ahwahneechee People and other Yosemite Natives from their traditional homelands.

In 1903, a dam in the northern portion of the park was proposed. Located in the Hetch Hetchy Valley, its purpose was to provide water and hydroelectric power to San Francisco. Muir and the Sierra Club opposed the project, while others, including Gifford Pinchot, supported it. In 1913, the U.S. Congress authorized the O'Shaughnessy Dam through passage of the Raker Act.

In the late 1920s a bid for Yosemite for the 1932 Winter Olympics was put forward. Ultimately, the 1932 Winter Olympics were awarded to Lake Placid, New York. In 1937, conservationist Rosalie Edge, head of the Emergency Conservation Committee (ECC), successfully lobbied Congress to purchase about 8,000 acres of old-growth sugar pines on the perimeter of Yosemite National Park that were to be logged.

In 1984, preservationists persuaded Congress to designate , or about 89 percent of the park, as the Yosemite Wilderness—a highly protected wilderness area. The Park Service has reduced artificial inducements to visit the park, such as the Firefall, in which red-hot embers were pushed off a cliff near Glacier Point at night. Traffic congestion and parking in Yosemite Valley during the summer months has become a concern.

In 2016, The Trust for Public Land purchased Ackerson Meadow, a 400-acre tract on the western edge of Yosemite National Park, for $2.3 million in order to preserve habitat and protect the area from development.  Ackerson Meadow was originally included in the proposed 1890 park boundary but never acquired by the federal government. The purchase and donation of the meadow was made possible through a cooperative effort by the Trust for Public Land, the National Park Service, and Yosemite Conservancy. On September 7, 2016, the National Park Service accepted the donation of the land, making the meadow the largest addition to Yosemite since 1949.

Geography

Yosemite National Park is located in the central Sierra Nevada of California. Three wilderness areas are adjacent to Yosemite: the Ansel Adams Wilderness to the southeast, the Hoover Wilderness to the northeast, and the Emigrant Wilderness to the north.

Two federally designated Wild and Scenic Rivers, the Merced and the Tuolumne, begin within Yosemite's borders and flow westward through the Sierra foothills, into the Central Valley of California. On average, about 4 million people visit the park each year, with most visitor use concentrated in the seven-square-mile (18 km2) area of Yosemite Valley.

Rocks and erosion

Almost all of the landforms in the Yosemite area are cut from the granitic rock of the Sierra Nevada Batholith (a batholith is a large mass of intrusive igneous rock that formed deep below the surface). About five percent of the park's landforms (mostly in its eastern margin near Mount Dana) are metamorphosed volcanic and sedimentary rocks. These rocks are called roof pendants because they were once the roof of the underlying granitic rock.

Erosion acting upon different types of uplift-created joint and fracture systems is responsible for creating the valleys, canyons, domes, and other features. These joints and fracture systems do not move, and are therefore not faults. Spacing between joints is controlled by the amount of silica in the granite and granodiorite rocks; more silica tends to create a more resistant rock, resulting in larger spaces between joints and fractures.

Pillars and columns, such as Washington Column and Lost Arrow, are created by cross joints. Erosion acting on master joints is responsible for creating valleys and later canyons. The single most erosive force over the last few million years has been large alpine glaciers, which have turned the previously V-shaped river-cut valleys into U-shaped glacial-cut canyons (such as Yosemite Valley and Hetch Hetchy Valley). Exfoliation (caused by the tendency of crystals in plutonic rocks to expand at the surface) acting on granitic rock with widely spaced joints is responsible for creating domes such as Half Dome and North Dome and inset arches like Royal Arches.

Popular features

Yosemite Valley represents only one percent of the park area, but this is where most visitors arrive and stay. The Tunnel View is the first view of the Valley for many visitors and is extensively photographed. El Capitan, a prominent granite cliff that looms over Yosemite Valley, is one of the most popular rock climbing destinations in the world because of its diverse range of climbing routes in addition to its year-round accessibility. Granite domes such as Sentinel Dome and Half Dome rise , respectively, above the valley floor. The park contains dozens of other granite domes.

The high country of Yosemite contains beautiful areas such as Tuolumne Meadows, Dana Meadows, the Clark Range, the Cathedral Range, and the Kuna Crest. The Sierra crest and the Pacific Crest Trail run through Yosemite, with peaks of red metamorphic rock, such as Mount Dana and Mount Gibbs, and granite peaks, such as Mount Conness. The Lyell Glacier is the largest glacier in Yosemite National Park and is one of the few remaining in the Sierra Nevada.

The park has three groves of ancient giant sequoia (Sequoiadendron giganteum) trees; the Mariposa Grove (200 trees), the Tuolumne Grove (25 trees), and the Merced Grove (20 trees). This species grows larger in volume than any other and is one of the tallest and longest-lived.

Water and ice

Hydrologic processes, including glaciation, flooding, and fluvial geomorphic response, have been fundamental in creating landforms in the park. Wetlands in Yosemite occur in valley bottoms throughout the park, and are often hydrologically linked to nearby lakes and rivers through seasonal flooding and groundwater movement.

Yosemite is famous for its high concentration of waterfalls in a small area. Numerous sheer drops, glacial steps and hanging valleys in the park provide many places for waterfalls to exist, especially during April, May, and June (the snowmelt season). Also in Yosemite Valley is the much lower volume Ribbon Falls, which has the highest single vertical drop, . Perhaps the most prominent of the Yosemite Valley waterfalls is Bridalveil Fall, which is the waterfall seen from the Tunnel View viewpoint at the east end of the Wawona Tunnel. Wapama Falls in Hetch Hetchy Valley is another notable waterfall. Hundreds of ephemeral waterfalls can become active in the park after heavy rains or melting snowpack.

All glaciers in the park are relatively small glaciers that occupy areas that are in almost permanent shade, such as north- and northeast-facing cirques. None of the Yosemite glaciers are a remnant of the Ice Age alpine glaciers responsible for sculpting the Yosemite landscape. Instead, they were formed during one of the neoglacial episodes that have occurred since the thawing of the Ice Age (such as the Little Ice Age). Many Yosemite glaciers, such as the Black Mountain Glacier that was discovered in 1871 and gone by the mid-1980s, have disappeared. Yosemite's final two glaciers – the Lyell and Maclure glaciers – have receded over the last 100 years and are expected by scientists to eventually disappear as a result of natural melting and climate change.

Climate

Yosemite has a Mediterranean climate (Köppen climate classification Csa), meaning most precipitation falls during the mild winter, and the other seasons are nearly dry (less than three percent of precipitation falls during the long, hot summers). Because of orographic lift, precipitation increases with elevation up to  where it slowly decreases to the crest. Snow does not typically persist on the ground until November in the high country. It accumulates all winter and into March or early April.

At elevations above , the hot, dry summer temperatures are moderated by frequent summer thunderstorms, along with snow that can persist into July. The combination of dry vegetation, low relative humidity, and thunderstorms results in frequent lightning-caused fires as well.

Freezing temperatures have been recorded in every month of the year.

Geology

Tectonic and volcanic activity

The area of the park was astride a passive continental margin during the Precambrian and early Paleozoic. Sediment was derived from continental sources and was deposited in shallow water. These rocks have since been deformed and metamorphosed.

Heat generated from the Farallon Plate subducting below the North American Plate led to the creation of an island arc of volcanoes on the west coast of proto-North America between the late Devonian and Permian periods. Material accreted onto the western edge of North America, and mountains were raised to the east in Nevada.

The first phase of regional plutonism started 210 million years ago in the late Triassic and continued throughout the Jurassic to about 150 million years before present (BP). The second major pluton emplacement phase lasted from about 120 million to 80 million years ago during the Cretaceous. This was part of the Sevier orogeny.

Starting 20 million years ago (in the Cenozoic) and lasting until 5 million years ago, a now-extinct extension of Cascade Range volcanoes erupted, bringing large amounts of igneous material in the area. These igneous deposits blanketed the region north of the Yosemite region. Volcanic activity persisted past 5 million years BP east of the current park borders in the Mono Lake and Long Valley areas.

Uplift and erosion

Starting 10 million years ago, vertical movement along the Sierra fault started to uplift the Sierra Nevada. Subsequent tilting of the Sierra block and the resulting accelerated uplift of the Sierra Nevada increased the gradient of western-flowing streams. The streams consequently ran faster and thus cut their valleys more quickly. Additional uplift occurred when major faults developed to the east, especially the creation of Owens Valley from Basin and Range-associated extensional forces. Uplift of the Sierra accelerated again about two million years ago during the Pleistocene.

The uplifting and increased erosion exposed granitic rocks in the area to surface pressures, resulting in exfoliation (responsible for the rounded shape of the many domes in the park) and mass wasting following the numerous fracture joint planes (cracks; especially vertical ones) in the now solidified plutons. Pleistocene glaciers further accelerated this process, while glacial meltwater transported the resulting talus and till from valley floors.

Numerous vertical joint planes controlled where and how fast erosion took place. Most of these long, linear and very deep cracks trend northeast or northwest and form parallel, often regularly spaced sets.

Sculpting by glaciers

A series of glaciations further modified the region starting about 2 to 3 million years ago and ending sometime around 10,000 BP. At least four major glaciations have occurred in the Sierra Nevada, locally called the Sherwin (also called the pre-Tahoe), Tahoe, Tenaya, and Tioga. The Sherwin glaciers were the largest, filling Yosemite and other valleys, while later stages produced much smaller glaciers. A Sherwin-age glacier was almost surely responsible for the major excavation and shaping of Yosemite Valley and other canyons in the area.

Merced Glacier flowed out of Yosemite Valley and into the Merced River Gorge. Lee Vining Glacier carved Lee Vining Canyon and emptied into Lake Russel (the much-enlarged ice age version of Mono Lake). Only the highest peaks, such as Mount Dana and Mount Conness, were not covered by glaciers.

Ecology

Habitats

Of California's 7,000 plant species, approximately 50 percent occur in the Sierra Nevada and more than 20 percent are within Yosemite. The park contains suitable habitat for more than 160 rare plants, with rare local geologic formations and unique soils characterizing the restricted ranges many of these plants occupy.

With its scrubby sun-baked chaparral, stately groves of pine, fir, and sequoia, and expanses of alpine woodlands and meadows, Yosemite National Park preserves a Sierra Nevada landscape as it prevailed before Euro-American settlement. Taken together, the park's varied habitats support over 250 species of vertebrates, which include fish, amphibians, reptiles, birds, and mammals.

Much of Yosemite's western boundary has habitats dominated by mixed coniferous forests of ponderosa pine, sugar pine, incense cedar, white fir, Douglas fir, and a few stands of giant sequoia, interspersed by areas of black oak and canyon live oak. A relatively high diversity of wildlife species is supported by these habitats, because of relatively mild, lower-elevation climate and the mixture of habitat types and plant species. Wildlife species typically found in these habitats include black bear, coyote, raccoon, mountain kingsnake, Gilbert's skink, white-headed woodpecker, bobcat, river otter, gray fox, red fox, brown creeper, two species of skunk, cougar, spotted owl, and a wide variety of bat species.

Going higher in elevation, the coniferous forests become purer stands of red fir, western white pine, Jeffrey pine, lodgepole pine, and the occasional foxtail pine. Fewer wildlife species tend to be found in these habitats, because of their higher elevation and lower complexity. Species likely to be found include golden-mantled ground squirrel, chickaree, fisher, Steller's jay, hermit thrush, and northern goshawk. Reptiles are not common, but include rubber boa, western fence lizard, and northern alligator lizard.

As the landscape rises, trees become smaller and more sparse, with stands broken by areas of exposed granite. These include lodgepole pine, whitebark pine, and mountain hemlock that, at highest elevations, give way to vast expanses of granite as treeline is reached. The climate in these habitats is harsh and the growing season is short, but species such as pika, yellow-bellied marmot, white-tailed jackrabbit, Clark's nutcracker, and black rosy finch are adapted to these conditions. Also, the treeless alpine habitats are the areas favored by Sierra Nevada bighorn sheep. This species, however, is now found in the Yosemite area only around Tioga Pass, where a small, reintroduced population exists.

At a variety of elevations, meadows provide important, productive habitat for wildlife. Animals come to feed on the green grasses and use the flowing and standing water found in many meadows. Predators, in turn, are attracted to these areas. The interface between meadow and forest is also favored by many animal species because of the proximity of open areas for foraging and cover for protection. Species that are highly dependent upon meadow habitat include great grey owl, willow flycatcher, Yosemite toad, and mountain beaver.

Management issues

The black bears of Yosemite were once famous for breaking into parked cars to steal food. They were also an encouraged tourist sight for many years at the park's garbage dumps, where bears congregated to eat park visitors' garbage and tourists gathered to photograph the bears. Increasing encounters between bears and humans and increasing damage to property led to an aggressive campaign to discourage bears from relying on human food or interacting with people and their property. The open-air dumps were closed; all trash receptacles were replaced with bear-proof receptacles; all campgrounds were equipped with bear-proof food lockers so that people would not leave food in their vehicles, which were easy targets for the powerful and resourceful bears. Because bears who show aggression towards people usually are eventually destroyed, park personnel have continued to come up with innovative ways to have bears associate humans and their property with unpleasant experiences, such as being hit with rubber bullets. , about 30 bears a year are captured and ear-tagged and their DNA is sampled so that, when bear damage occurs, rangers can ascertain which bear is causing the problem.

Despite the richness of high-quality habitats in Yosemite, the brown bear, California condor, and least Bell's vireo have become extinct in the park within historical time, and another 37 species currently have special status under either California or federal endangered species legislation. The most serious current threats to Yosemite's wildlife and the ecosystems they occupy include loss of a natural fire regime, exotic species, air pollution, habitat fragmentation, and climate change. On a more local basis, factors such as road kills and the availability of human food have affected some wildlife species.

Yosemite National Park has documented more than 130 non-native plant species within park boundaries. These non-native plants were introduced into Yosemite following the migration of early Euro-American settlers in the late 1850s. Natural and human-caused disturbances, such as wildland fires and construction activities, have contributed to a rapid increase in the spread of non-native plants. A number of these species aggressively invade and displace the native plant communities, resulting in impacts on the park's resources. Non-native plants can bring about significant changes in park ecosystems by altering the native plant communities and the processes that support them. Some non-native species may cause an increase in the fire frequency of an area or increase the available nitrogen in the soil that may allow more non-native plants to become established. Many non-native species, such as yellow star thistle (Centaurea solstitialis), are able to produce a long tap root that allows them to out-compete the native plants for available water.

Bull thistle (Cirsium vulgare), common mullein (Verbascum thapsus), and Klamath weed (Hypericum perforatum) have been identified as noxious pests in Yosemite since the 1940s. Additional species that have been recognized more recently as aggressive and requiring control are yellow star thistle (Centaurea solstitialis), sweet clover (Melilot spp.), Himalayan blackberry (Rubus armeniacus), cut-leaved blackberry (Rubus laciniatus) and large periwinkle (Vinca major).

Increasing ozone pollution is causing tissue damage to the massive giant sequoia trees in the park, making them more vulnerable to insect infestation and disease. Since the cones of these trees require fire-touched soil to germinate, historic fire suppression has reduced these trees' ability to reproduce. The current policy of setting prescribed fires is expected to help the germination issue.

Wildfires

Natives to Yosemite traditionally and intentionally set small fires in the valley in the early 1860s and much earlier before that to clear the ground of brush as part as their farming practices, resulting in easier crop growth and faster cultivation. These fires that Yosemite Natives lit are comparable to contemporary practices like controlled burns which are done by the U.S. Forest Service and other environmental experts. Although it was not their primary concern for setting these fires, the Ahwahneechee and other Yosemite Natives helped preserve local biodiversity and ecosystem resilience by lighting these small fires. Native Americans used fire as an early wildlife management tool to keep certain lands clear, resulting in more food for large animals and decreasing the chance of large forest fires which devastate forest ecosystems in modern times. Some early uncontrolled forest fires were set accidentally by the militia group led by Major John Savage when the group burned down the Ahwahneechee camp in an attempt to remove them from the land. The houses that they lit on fire eventually caught a large section of the forest on fire and the militia group ended up having to abandon their raid to save their own camp from the wildfire they started.

Forest fires seasonally clear the park of dead vegetation, making way for new growth. These fires damage the income generated by tourism. During late July and early August, 2018, sections of the park, including the Valley, were temporarily closed due to the Ferguson Fire at its western boundary. The closing was the largest in almost thirty years at the park.

Activities

Camping and public access
Yosemite Valley is open year-round and numerous activities are available through the National Park Service, Yosemite Conservancy, and Aramark at Yosemite, including nature walks, photography and art classes, stargazing programs, tours, bike rentals, rafting, mule and horseback rides, and rock climbing classes. Many people enjoy short walks and longer hikes to waterfalls in Yosemite Valley, or walks among giant sequoias in the Mariposa, Tuolumne, or Merced Groves. Others like to drive or take a tour bus to Glacier Point (summer–fall) to see views of Yosemite Valley and the high country, or drive along the scenic Tioga Road to Tuolumne Meadows (May–October) and go for a walk or hike.

Most park visitors stay just for the day, and visit only those locations within Yosemite Valley that are easily accessible by automobile. There is a US$35 per automobile user fee to enter the park, which is valid for 7 consecutive days. Traffic congestion in the valley is a serious problem during peak season, in summer. A free shuttle bus system operates year-round in the valley, and park rangers encourage people to use this system since parking within the valley during the summer is often nearly impossible to find. Transit options are available from Fresno and Merced. Yosemite also has 13 official campgrounds where visitors can camp. 

In addition to exploring the natural features of the park, visitors can also learn about the natural and cultural history of Yosemite Valley at a number of facilities in the valley: the Yosemite Valley Visitor Center, the adjoining Yosemite Museum, and the Nature Center at Happy Isles. There are also two National Historic Landmarks: the Sierra Club's LeConte Memorial Lodge (Yosemite's first public visitor center), and the Ahwahnee Hotel. Camp 4 was added to the National Register of Historic Places in 2003.

In the winter, it is snowed in, but the area of Tuolumne Meadows has a great deal of hiking, rock climbing, and mountain climbing; see also the highest mountains of Yosemite National Park.

Hiking

Over  of trails are available to hikers—everything from an easy stroll to a challenging mountain hike, or an overnight backpack trip. One of the most popular trails leads to the summit of Half Dome and requires an advance permit from Memorial Day weekend in late May, to Columbus Day in early October. A maximum of 300 hikers, selected by lottery, are permitted to advance beyond the base of the subdome each day, including 225 day hikers and 75 backpackers.

The park can be divided into five sections for the day-user—Yosemite Valley, Wawona/Mariposa Grove/Glacier Point, Tuolumne Meadows, Hetch Hetchy, and Crane Flat/White Wolf. Numerous books describe park trails, and free information is available from the National Park Service in Yosemite. Park rangers encourage visitors to experience portions of the park in addition to Yosemite Valley.

Between late spring and early fall, much of the park can be accessed for multiple-day backpacking trips. All overnight trips into the back country require a wilderness permit and most require approved bear-resistant food storage.

Driving destinations

While some locations in Yosemite require hiking, other locations can be reached via automobile transportation. Driving locations also allow guests to observe the night sky in locations other than their campsite or lodge. All of the roads in Yosemite are scenic, but the most famous is the Tioga Road, typically open from late May or early June through November.

As an alternative to driving, bicycles are allowed on the roads. However, bicycles are allowed off-road on only  of paved trails in Yosemite Valley itself; mountain biking is not allowed.

Climbing

Rock climbing is an important part of Yosemite. In particular Yosemite Valley, which is surrounded by famous summits like Half Dome and El Capitan. Camp 4, a walk-in campground in the Valley, was instrumental in the development of rock climbing as a sport, and is listed on the National Register of Historic Places. Climbers can generally be spotted in the snow-free months on anything from ten-foot-high (3 m) boulders to the  face of El Capitan. Classes on rock climbing are offered by numerous groups.

Winter activities

Yosemite Valley is open all year, although some roads within the park close in winter. Downhill skiing is available at the Badger Pass Ski Area—the oldest downhill skiing area in California, offering downhill skiing from mid-December through early April. Much of the park is open to cross-country skiing and snowshoeing, with several backcountry ski huts open for use. Wilderness permits are required for backcountry overnight ski trips.

The Bracebridge dinner is an annual holiday event, held since 1927 at the Ahwahnee Hotel, inspired by Washington Irving's descriptions of Squire Bracebridge and English Christmas traditions of the 18th century in his Sketch Book. Between 1929 and 1973, the show was organized by Ansel Adams.

Other
Bicycle rentals are available in Yosemite Valley spring through fall. Over  of paved bike paths are available in Yosemite Valley. In addition, bicyclists can ride on regular roads. Helmets are required by law for children under 18 years of age. Off-trail riding and mountain biking are not permitted in Yosemite National Park.

Water activities are plentiful during warmer months. Rafting can be done through the Yosemite Valley on the Merced River from late May to July. There are also swimming pools available at Yosemite Lodge and Curry Village.

In 2010, Yosemite National Park was honored with its own quarter under the America the Beautiful Quarters program.

Horsetail Fall
Horsetail Fall flows over the eastern edge of El Capitan in Yosemite Valley. This small waterfall usually flows only during winter and is easy to miss. On rare occasions during mid- to late February, it can glow orange when it's backlit by sunset. This unique lighting effect happens only on evenings with a clear sky when the waterfall is flowing. Even some haze or minor cloudiness can greatly diminish or eliminate the effect. Although entirely natural, the phenomenon is reminiscent of the human-caused Firefall that historically occurred from Glacier Point.

In popular culture

The opening scenes of Star Trek V: The Final Frontier (1989) were filmed in Yosemite National Park. Films such as The Last of the Mohicans (1920) and Maverick (1994) have also been shot here. The 2014 documentary Valley Uprising is centered around Yosemite Valley and its history with an emphasis on the climbing culture. The Academy Award-winning 2018 documentary Free Solo was filmed in Yosemite. The Dawn Wall, a 2017 documentary, was also filmed in Yosemite.

See also

Citations

General references

 
 
 
 Muir, John. "Features of the Proposed Yosemite National Park" The Century; a popular quarterly (Sept. 1890) 40#5

External links

  of the National Park Service
 Yosemite Conservancy
 The Role of the Railroads in Yellowstone and Yosemite National Parks from American Studies at the University of Virginia
 Yosemite Mariposa County Tourism Bureau
Media specific
 Project Yosemite | Yosemite HD | Motion Timelapse Video
 
 Historic Photographs of Yosemite National Park taken by Edith Irvine
 Project Yosemite | An ongoing adventure to timelapse Yosemite in an extreme way
 My First Summer in the Sierra by John Muir. Free MP3 audio recording from LibriVox.org

 
1890 establishments in California
Protected areas established in 1890
Sierra Nevada (United States)
Parks in Madera County, California
Parks in Mariposa County, California
Parks in Tuolumne County, California
World Heritage Sites in the United States
Hetch Hetchy Project
Protected areas of the Sierra Nevada (United States)
National parks in California
Nature centers in California